Endotricha punicea is a species of snout moth in the genus Endotricha. It was described by Paul Ernest Sutton Whalley in 1963, and is known from China (Henan, Hubei, Tibet).

References

Moths described in 1963
Endotrichini